Half Moon Shoal, also known as Hasa Hasa Shoal; Mandarin , is a shoal at the eastern edge of the Spratly Islands of the South China Sea. China and the Philippines have competing claims over the shoal. It is located close to Northeast Investigator Shoal and 100 km from Palawan, Philippines.

Notable incidents
The Chinese frigate Dongguan ran aground on the shoal on 11 July 2012.

On 6 May 2014, Philippine police arrested 11 Chinese fishermen allegedly poaching sea turtles on board the fishing boat, Qiongqionghai, near the Half Moon Shoal.

On 29 August 2018, BRP Gregorio del Pillar ran aground at the shoal.

References

Shoals of the Spratly Islands